Advances in Operator Theory is a peer-reviewed scientific journal established in 2016 by Mohammad Sal Moslehian and published by  Birkhäuser on behalf of the Tusi Mathematical Research Group. It covers functional analysis and operator theory and related topics.

Abstracting and indexing
The journal is abstracted and indexed in Scopus, MathSciNet, Emerging Sources Citation Index, and Zentralblatt MATH.

See also
Annals of Functional Analysis
Banach Journal of Mathematical Analysis

References

External links

Mathematics journals
Publications established in 2016
English-language journals
Quarterly journals